Mark Gerard Price (born 10 August 1959, in Nelson, Lancashire) is an English drummer known for being a member of All About Eve and Del Amitri.

Early life
Mark Price grew up in Nelson, Lancashire and attended Walton High School, Burnley College of Art, and Manchester Polytechnic where he graduated in Graphic Design, moving to London in 1980.

Career

Nik Kershaw
Price's joined Nik Kershaw's band in 1983, touring for the next four years, including at Live Aid in 1985.

All About Eve
Price was recruited to All About Eve in 1987, during the recording of their first album. He appeared in photographs on the album cover even though he did not play on all of the songs, which instead featured the Mission's Mick Brown. He remained with the band and featured on their next three albums until they split up in 1993. He briefly carried on with Marty Willson-Piper and Andy Cousin to create the one-off album Seeing Stars, and recorded with Julianne Regan's side project Mice.

The Cure
Following the departure of drummer Boris Williams, Price played on "Mint Car", "Trap" and "Treasure" on The Cure's Wild Mood Swings album, and on the B-Side "A Pink Dream". Another drummer, Jason Cooper, was ultimately chosen as Williams' permanent replacement.

Del Amitri
In 1997, Price joined Del Amitri. He toured extensively with them and appears on the 2002 album Can You Do Me Good? and the Top 40 hit singles "Don't Come Home Too Soon" (1998), "Cry to Be Found" (1998) and "Just Before You Leave" (2002).

All About Eve reunion
Price played the drums for the All About Eve reunion tour in 1999, but he stayed with Del Amitri, and so All About Eve carried on without him, initially touring acoustically and then recruiting a series of other drummers.

See also
 List of drummers

References

1959 births
Living people
People from Burnley
English rock drummers
Gothic rock musicians
Del Amitri members
All About Eve (band) members